Amy Tolsky (born December 19, 1961) is an American actress. Tolsky was raised in Chicago, Illinois. She has appeared in several films and television shows.

Selected filmography
Married (2014) – Ortho Receptionist 
General Hospital (2014) – Stacy
Jewvangelist (2014) – Mrs. Coen 
Eat With Me (2013) – Candy
Castle  (2013) – Sue Williams
Old Souls (2013 TV movie) – Snarky Agent
Holding Patterns (2013 TV movie) – Flight Attendant
2 Broke Girls (2012) – Staples Lady / Violet
Last Man Standing (2012) – Mrs. Flagg
See Dad Run (2012) – Mom 
Parks and Recreation (2012) – Lucinda 
The Big Bang Theory (2012) – Joan
Bent (2012) – Gayle 
Raising Hope (2012) – Gwen
Weeds (2011) – Desk Attendant
Wizards of Waverly Place (2011) – Florence
Hawthorne (2010) – Doctor
The Closer (2009) – Nurse
Trust Me (2009) – Curly Hair
The New Adventures of Old Christine (2008) – Heidi Baker
Terminator: The Sarah Connor Chronicles (2008) – Housewife
Out of Jimmy's Head (2007) – Coach
Cory in the House (2007) – Dr. Vanderslyce
Burn (2007 TV movie) – Mrs. Greenburg 
That's So Raven (2006) – Mrs. Rothschild
Cooked (2005 TV movie) – Real Estate Lady 
Humor Me (2004 TV movie) – Real Estate Lady
Christmas Rush (2002 TV movie; voice role)
Scrubs (2002) – Bespectacled Nurse
The Amanda Show (2001) – Nurse
Strong Medicine (2000–2001) – Jean
The Nanny (1999) – Singer
Chicks (1999 TV movie) – Spa Woman
Caroline in the City (1998) 
Another House on Mercy Street (1997) – Gallery Guest
Intimate with a Stranger (1995) – Carol
Cinderumplestiltskin (1993 TV movie) – Bertha
Jeeves and Wooster (1993) – Reporter

External links 

Website http://amytolsky.nowcasting.com/

1961 births
Living people
Actresses from Chicago
American film actresses
American television actresses
21st-century American women